Cuatro en la frontera is a 1958 Spanish film directed by Antonio Santillán. Written
by Joaquín Algars and Nené Cascallar, it stars Claudine Dupuis, Danielle Godet, and Estanis González.

Plot 
A French National Treasury van is assaulted and they steal the gold bullion it was carrying. According to confidences received by the Police Headquarters of Barcelona, it seems that part of the gold is clandestinely introduced into Spain through the Pyrenees. In order to discover and eradicate such smuggling infiltration, an agent pretends to be a day laborer at a farm located on the border and in a suspicious area.

Cast
Claudine Dupuis as Isabelle
Danielle Godet as Olivia
Estanis González as Estanis González 		
Frank Latimore as Javier
Miguel Ligero 
Armando Moreno as Roca 'José Sancho' 
Adriano Rimoldi 			
Julio Riscal
Gérard Tichy as Julio

Bibliography 

 SOLÉ I IRLA, MARTÍ (1954). "Cuatro en la frontera": parlem de pel·lícules rodades íntegrament o en part a la Cerdanya. Puigcerdà, l'autor, DL 2016.

References

External links
 

1958 films
1950s Spanish-language films
Spanish crime films
1958 crime films
1950s Spanish films